Velvet Crush is an American power pop band from Providence, Rhode Island, United States, that achieved prominence in indie-rock circles in the early- and mid-1990s.  The band broke up in 1996 but re-formed in 1998 and have continued to record, releasing their most recent album in 2004.  Vocalist/bassist Paul Chastain and drummer Ric Menck are the band's core members, having previously worked together as Choo Choo Train, Bag-O-Shells, and The Springfields, and they share singing and songwriting duties.  Guitarist Jeffrey Underhill (of Honeybunch) played on the band's first three albums, In the Presence of Greatness, Teenage Symphonies to God, and Heavy Changes. In the Presence of Greatness was produced by Matthew Sweet, while the second and third albums were produced by Mitch Easter.

History
Chastain had recorded in the mid-1980s as a solo artist and as a member of Nines and The Stupid Cupids, while Menck had been a member of The Reverbs and The Paint Set. The long association between Chastain and Menck began in 1987 with the indie pop band Choo Choo Train, who released two singles and an EP and were signed to the British indie label The Subway Organization. The duo also recorded for Sarah Records as The Springfields, and for Bus Stop as Bag-O-Shells. Both had been based in Chicago, but they relocated to Rhode Island around this time. Opting for a more rock-oriented 
power pop sound, the duo formed Velvet Crush in 1989, with Jeffery Borchardt of Honeybunch. After three singles on Bus Stop Records, the band released a cover version of Teenage Fanclub's "Everything Flows", as an extra track on the CD Single of 'Ash & Earth, on Seminal Twang, run by David Barker of Glass Records, who was in charge of the Paperhouse label for Fire Records at this time. Paperhouse were keen to release the first Velvet Crush LP,  but they chose to sign to Creation Records in the UK, who issued the band's debut album, In the Presence of Greatness, in 1991. The band stayed with Creation for a second album, Teenage Symphonies to God, released in 1994 (on Sony Records in the US). The group members spent the next few years acting as Stephen Duffy's backing band, recording two albums with the singer. Velvet Crush returned in 1998 with the Heavy Changes album, now on the Action Musik label. Another album, Free Expression, followed in 1999, by which time the band was reduced to a duo of Chastain and Menck. Soft Sounds followed in 2002, and Stereo Blues in 2004.

In 2015 David Barker revived his Glass Records label, and reissued In the Presence of Greatness on vinyl in October 2018 on the Glass Modern imprint.

In July 2019 Menck and Chastain reunited with Underhill and added Jason-Victor on lead guitar for a mini-reunion tour of New England.

Discography

Choo Choo Train

Singles
"This Perfect Day" (1987) Picture Book
The Briar Rose EP (1988) The Subway Organization
"High" single 7" (1989) The Subway Organization
"High" EP 12" (1989) The Subway Organization

Compilation Album
Briar High (The 1988 Singles) (1992) The Subway Organization

The Springfields
"Sunflower" (1988) Sarah (UK indie No. 8)
"Tomorrow Ends Today" (1991) Picture Book
"Wonder" (1991) Sarah
"Tranquil" (1991) Seminal Twang/Summershine

Bag-O-Shells
"Markers" (1988 - 7" - Bus Stop)
"Pocket Book" (1990 - 7" - Bus Stop)

Paul Chastain & Ric Menck
Hey Wimpus: The Early Recordings of Paul Chastain & Ric Menck (1998) Action Musik

Velvet Crush

Albums
In the Presence of Greatness (1991) Creation/Ringers Lactate
Teenage Symphonies to God (1994) Creation/Sony
Heavy Changes (1998) Action Musik
Free Expression (1999) Bobsled
Soft Sounds (2002) Action Musik
Stereo Blues (2004)

Compilations, live albums
Rock Concert (2000) Action Musik
A Single Odessey (2001) Action Musik
Timeless Melodies (2001) Epic
Melody Freaks (demos & outtakes 1990-1996) (2002) Action Musik

Singles
"If Not True" (1990) Bus Stop
"Walking Out on Love" (1990) Raving Pop Blast (split flexi disc with The Golden Dawn)
"Ash & Earth" (1991) Seminal Twang (UK) (includes Everything Flows on the CD version)
"Ash & Earth" (1991) Bus Stop (US)
"Window to the World" (1992) Creation
The Post Greatness EP (1992) Creation
"Drive Me Down" (1992) Creation
"Remember the Lightning" (1994) The Bob magazine (split flexi disc with Guided by Voices)
"Hold Me Up" (1994) Parasol
"Hold Me Up" (1994) Creation
"Why Not Your Baby" (1995) Creation
"Gentle Breeze" (2000) Bobsled

References

External links
1994 interview with Ric Menck on Ready Steady Go
 Velvet Crush at Rolling Stone

American power pop groups
American alternative country groups
American folk rock groups
Creation Records artists
Musical groups from Providence, Rhode Island
550 Music artists